Llewellyn Evans (2 January 1876 – 29 September 1951) was a Welsh field hockey player who competed in the 1908 Summer Olympics. In 1908, he won the bronze medal as member of the team Wales.

References

External links
 
Llewellyn Evans' profile at databaseOlympics.com

1876 births
1951 deaths
Welsh male field hockey players
Olympic field hockey players of Great Britain
British male field hockey players
Field hockey players at the 1908 Summer Olympics
Olympic bronze medallists for Great Britain
Olympic medalists in field hockey
Welsh Olympic medallists
Medalists at the 1908 Summer Olympics